Anatoly Mikhailovich Litvak  (10 May 1902 – 15 December 1974), better known as Anatole Litvak, was a Ukrainian-born American filmmaker who wrote, directed, and produced films in various countries and languages. He began his theatrical training at age 13 in Petrograd, Russia (now again known as St. Petersburg).

Litvak was notable for directing little-known foreign actors to early fame and is believed to have contributed to several actors winning Academy Awards. In 1936 he directed Mayerling, a film which made French actors Charles Boyer and Danielle Darrieux international stars. He returned Swedish star Ingrid Bergman to popularity with American audiences in 1956 with Anastasia, in which she won her second Oscar. He directed Olivia de Havilland to an Academy Award nomination for The Snake Pit (1948). He directed Jean Gabin in his screen debut and directed Elia Kazan in his earliest acting role, City for Conquest.

Litvak directed Confessions of a Nazi Spy in 1939, starring Edward G. Robinson, which used actual newsreel footage from U.S. Nazi rallies. As a refugee from Nazi Germany, Litvak was among the few directors who tried to open Hollywood's eyes to the threat Germany posed to Europe and the world.

During World War II, he enlisted and co-directed documentaries with Frank Capra, including Why We Fight films. His solo-directed, The Battle of Russia (1943), won numerous awards and was nominated for an Oscar. Because of Litvak's ability to speak Russian, German, and French, he supervised the filming of the D-Day Normandy landings. He also filmed aerial warfare with the U.S. Eighth Air Force. He was promoted to full colonel by the end of the war for his volunteer wartime efforts. He received special awards from the governments of France, Britain, and the United States.

Early years 
Anatoly Mikhailovich Litvak was born in Kyiv, Kiev Governorate, Russian Empire, and grew up in a Lithuanian Jewish family. ("Litvak" means "Lithuanian" in Yiddish). The family moved to St. Petersburg, the capital of the Russian Empire. As a teenager, he worked at a theater and took acting lessons at the state drama school.

Litvak began work in film at Leningrad's Nordkino Studios, where he was assistant director for nine silent films in the 1920s. For political and ideological reasons, and especially because Russian theaters were nationalized by the Soviet government in the 1920s, he left Russia for Berlin, Germany in 1925. There he would have more artistic possibilities.

Director in Europe

Germany 
Litvak's first film as director was the musical Dolly Gets Ahead (1930) with Dolly Haas. He followed it with two Lilian Harvey films, No More Love (1931) and Calais-Dover (1931).

He directed Lilac (1932)  in France.  He returned to Germany for The Song of Night (1932), shot at the same time as an English version, released as Tell Me Tonight (1932). He went to England to direct Sleeping Car (1933), starring Ivor Novello.

France 
Following Adolf Hitler's rise to power with the Nazi Party in 1933, Litvak moved to France. Paris became his favored locale for shooting films. Thirteen of his thirty-seven films were set there.

He made Cette vieille canaille (1933) and Flight Into Darkness (1935).

According to film historian Ronald Bowers, Litvak became skilled in using location shooting and realistic documentary effects as early as the 1930s. He also became known in the industry for emphasizing sound effects over dialogue in sound films. He preferred to keep the camera running with tracking shots and pans. Given his preference for achieving motion in camerawork, he often used crane shots, and sat with the cameraman to be sure he was getting what he wanted.

Mayerling 
Mayerling (1936), which starred French actors Charles Boyer and Danielle Darrieux, is credited with establishing Litvak's international reputation as a producer and director. The film was widely praised by critics; some reviewers called it "one of the most compelling love stories the cinema has produced," and "a romantic tragedy of the highest order." American writer Lincoln Kirstein claimed the film became "a kind of standard for the romantic film in an historical setting." In describing Litvak's cinematography style in the film, critic Jack Edmund Nolan writes that it is "replete with the camera trackings, pans and swoops, techniques which later became the trademark of Max Ophuls."

Hollywood and World War II

Warner Bros 
The worldwide success of Mayerling brought Litvak invitations from Hollywood; he was offered a four-year contract by Warner Brothers. After accepting the contract, Litvak became one of Hollywood's leading directors by the late 1930s. He was lucky to have left France before its fall to the Nazi invasion and occupation.

He directed such films as The Woman I Love (1937); Tovarich (1937) with Boyer, a comedy celebrating "outmoded values of the ruined Russian aristocracy"; The Amazing Dr. Clitterhouse (1938); and The Sisters (1938), starring Bette Davis and Errol Flynn.

Also with Warner Brothers, he directed Confessions of a Nazi Spy, a 1939 film starring Edward G. Robinson as an FBI agent who breaks up a Nazi spy ring. It was released at a time of increasing tensions in Europe as the Nazis promoted their expansion. Among the techniques he used in the film to achieve realism was the inclusion of newsreel footage from U.S. Nazi rallies. While the story was fictional, the espionage methods that it revealed were considered factual. The film was described as the "strongest and most thrilling dramatic movie" that had ever been put on screen. The film was banned in Germany, and by its Fascist allies Italy and Spain. Neutral countries such as Switzerland and Ireland also banned it. The producers hoped to arouse concern in the United States, where many people wanted to pursue isolation and stay out of any "European war."

Biographer Alexander Walker said in his book about Vivien Leigh, that Litvak tried to open Hollywood's eyes to the threat Germany posed to Europe and the world. Leigh, who later starred in Litvak's The Deep Blue Sea (1955), recalls her Sunday morning visits to Litvak and his wife, Miriam Hopkins. She learned from him that the studios were trying to protect their investments in German box office and did not want to produce films that would offend that country. Hollywood's "comfortable isolationism affronted her."

After Castle on the Hudson (1940), Litvak produced and directed All This and Heaven Too, starring Bette Davis and Charles Boyer. The film was nominated for an Academy Award as Best Picture.

That same year he co-produced and directed City for Conquest, starring James Cagney and supporting actor Elia Kazan. This was one of Kazan's few film roles before he became a leading director. The Hollywood Reporter gave Litvak's directing special praise:

He directed two films released the same year: Out of the Fog (1941) and Blues in the Night (1941). 20th Century Fox borrowed him under contract to direct This Above All (1942).

World War II and Why We Fight 
Litvak, having by then become an American citizen, enlisted in the United States Army at the beginning of US involvement in World War II. During the war, when he directed training and other films, and documentaries about the war, he was promoted to lieutenant colonel. He joined with fellow director Frank Capra to make the Why We Fight war training film series, most of which included newsreel footage.

Films they co-directed for the series included Prelude to War (1942), The Nazis Strike (1943), Divide and Conquer (1943), The Battle of China (1944) and War Comes to America (1945). Capra was in charge of production for all the films.

Litvak became involved with helping the Soviet Union in August 1941, soon after it was invaded by Nazi Germany. He was treasurer of the Russian War Relief Association, which sponsored international radio benefits with stars such as Edward G. Robinson and Ronald Colman.

Litvak co-produced and alone directed The Battle of Russia in 1943. After the film was released, he was sent to Russia on a special mission, in which he held a private screening for the Russian General Staff. The theme of the film was to show the heroic manner that the Russian people fought against the Nazis. U.S. ambassador to Russia W. Averell Harriman asked Litvak to narrate the English-language film into Russian during the screening.

Litvak recalled:

Litvak was decorated by Soviet leader Joseph Stalin for his work on this film. It was shown in theaters throughout Russia. During his trip to Russia, Litvak briefly reunited with his mother in Leningrad; they had not seen each other for nearly 20 years. After the film's excellent reception in the U.S., it won the New York Film Critics Award as Best Documentary.

He later directed Operation Titanic (1943), and War Comes to America (1945), the final film in the Why We Fight series. The films were scripted by Anthony Veiller and narrated by Walter Huston, with music by Dimitri Tiomkin, another Russian-born émigré to Hollywood. Prelude to War won the Oscar for Best Documentary of 1942. Because of Litvak's ability to speak Russian, German, and French, he subsequently supervised the filming of the D-Day Normandy landings. He also filmed aerial warfare with the U.S. Eighth Air Force.

Because Litvak joined the army to help Capra produce the film series, the director said he was one of the "Hollywood knights" who came to America's "rescue," and without whose help "no one could have made the Why We Fight films."

Ending the war as a full colonel, Litvak received special awards from the governments of France, Britain, and the United States for his work. The French government awarded him the Légion d'Honneur and the Croix de Guerre. The British government awarded him with a gold medal, ribbon, and citation as an honorary officer of the Order of the British Empire. By an order from Winston Churchill, all the films in the Why We Fight series were to be shown in all public theaters throughout Britain. From the U.S., he received the United States Legion of Merit and a Bronze Star Medal.

Post-war films

Hollywood 
At the end of the war, Litvak returned to filmmaking with The Long Night (1947), a flop thriller at RKO.

He directed Barbara Stanwyck and Burt Lancaster in Sorry, Wrong Number, a role which film historian James Robert Parish states is Stanwyck's "greatest screen triumph." Litvak directed using a "variety of surrealistic and expressionistic devices," notes Film Noir magazine. "Litvak isn't afraid to use close-ups either. And his players not only stand up to this relentless probing but offer some of the greatest performances of their lives.". Stanwyck was nominated for the best actress academy award.

Litvak was nominated in 1948 for a Best Director Oscar for The Snake Pit (1948), starring Olivia de Havilland. The film was nominated for Best Actress, Best Screenplay and Best Musical Score. To prepare de Havilland for her role as a mental patient, she and Litvak spent months observing actual patients at mental hospitals. Litvak had purchased the pre-publication rights to the story which is based on a fictionalized autobiography.

Europe 
In the 1950s, Litvak began filming in Europe.

In 1951, his war film Decision Before Dawn filmed on location in Germany was nominated for an Academy Award for Best Picture. Thousands of French admirers of the film signed a huge scroll which they sent to AMPAS, insisting that the film be given an Oscar. It was Oskar Werner's first acting role in an American film.

Among his productions there was Act of Love (1953) with Kirk Douglas filmed in Paris, and The Deep Blue Sea (1955) with Vivien Leigh and Kenneth More shot in England.

He directed Anastasia, filmed in Paris in 1956, starring Ingrid Bergman, Yul Brynner and Helen Hayes. The film was Bergman's first U.S. film after a seven-year absence from Hollywood, which she left after her scandalous affair with director Roberto Rossellini became news. Twentieth Century Fox conducted a poll and found that the public still had negative feelings toward Bergman. Litvak, however,  felt she would be an excellent actress for the part and insisted on her starring in the film. Bergman won an Oscar for Best Actress for her part, and film critic Michael Barson calls it Litvak's best film of the 1950s.

Litvak directed Mayerling (1957) for television with Audrey Hepburn, then The Journey (1959) with Yul Brynner that was filmed in Austria.

At the 1961 Cannes Film Festival, Litvak's Goodbye Again (also starring Ingrid Bergman) was nominated for the Palme d'Or. It starred Anthony Perkins who was reunited with Litvak in Five Miles to Midnight (1962) with both films shot in Paris. He produced, but did not direct, Jules Dassin's 10:30 P.M. Summer (1966).

Litvak filmed The Night of the Generals (1967) in France, Germany and Poland; a movie about three Nazi Generals suspected of murder, starring Peter O'Toole and Donald Pleasence. Litvak said about the film's subdued tones: "We tried staying away from color as much as we could; color can be bad, particularly with the war; it takes away from reality in the most horrible way."

In France and Poland, he later filmed The Lady in the Car with Glasses and a Gun.

Personal life 
In 1937, Litvak became the third husband of American actress Miriam Hopkins; their marriage ended in divorce in 1939. His second marriage was in 1955 to the model Sophie Steur. They remained married until his death.

Litvak died in 1974 in the Parisian suburb of Neuilly-sur-Seine.

For his contribution to the motion picture industry, Litvak has a star on the Hollywood Walk of Fame at 6633 Hollywood Blvd.

Filmography 

 Dolly Gets Ahead (1930)
 No More Love (1931)
 Calais-Dover (1931)
 Tell Me Tonight (1932)
 The Song of Night (1932)
   (1932)
 Sleeping Car (1933)
  (1935)
 Mayerling (1936)
 The Woman I Love (1937)
 Tovarich (1937)
 The Sisters (1938)
 The Amazing Dr. Clitterhouse (1938)
 Confessions of a Nazi Spy (1939)
 Castle on the Hudson  (1940)
 City for Conquest (1940)
 All This and Heaven Too (1940)

 Out of the Fog  (1941)
 Blues in the Night  (1941)
 This Above All (1942)
 The Long Night (1947)
 Sorry, Wrong Number (1948)
 The Snake Pit  (1948)
 Decision Before Dawn (1951)
 Act of Love, aka Un acte d'amour (1953)
 The Deep Blue Sea (1955)
 Anastasia  (1956)
 Mayerling (1957)
 The Journey (1959)
 Goodbye Again (1961), aka Aimez-vous Brahms?
 Five Miles to Midnight (1962)
 The Night of the Generals (1967)
 The Lady in the Car with Glasses and a Gun (1970)

References 

Other sources
 Michelangelo Capua, Anatole Litvak: His Life and His Films, McFarland & Co., Jefferson, N.C. 2015.

External links 

1902 births
1974 deaths
American film directors
American people of Lithuanian-Jewish descent
United States Army personnel of World War II
Soviet emigrants to Germany
Soviet emigrants to France
French emigrants to the United States
Film people from Kyiv
People with acquired American citizenship
Soviet film directors
Soviet film producers
Silent film directors
United States Army colonels
Recipients of the Legion of Honour
Recipients of the Legion of Merit
Recipients of the Croix de Guerre 1939–1945 (France)